Rosa Galcerán Vilanova (Barcelona, 1917 - November 28, 2015) was a Spanish cartoonist, advertising artist, and poet. She was a pioneer in her work as a comics artist, at a time when the profession was mostly male.

Career 
Galcerán was first published in the magazine Porvenir in 1937. Between 1942 and 1946, she joined the production company Diarmo Films collaborating in the first animated films with Arturo Moreno: El capitán Tormentoso, Garbancito de la Mancha (1945) and Alegre vacations. She alternated this work with collaborations in the magazine in  under editor Consuelo Gil.

Until 1971, most of her subsequent work for the women's publications of Editorial Toray, mainly for the fairy tale magazine Azucena, which she founded in 1946.  She also published the collection Cuentos de la Abuelita ("Grandma's Stories", 1949).

She was a member of the literary group Poesía Viva and the Seminar of poetic research.  In addition to her work in illustration and advertising, Galcerán devoted herself to painting and published several works of poetry. In 1997, she published the book Poemes de Tardor (Ed. Poesía Viva) and in 2004 Sons yRessons (Ed. Comte D'aure, S.L. 2004, eBook).

Notes

References 
 CUADRADO, Jesús (2000). Atlas español de la cultura popular: De la historieta y su uso 1873-2000. Madrid: Ediciones Sinsentido/Fundación Germán Sánchez Ruipérez. 2 v. . 
 RAMÍREZ, Juan Antonio (1975). El "comic" femenino en España. Arte sub y anulación. Madrid: Editorial Cuadernos para el Diálogo, S. A. Colección Divulgación universitaria, Arte y literatura, número 78. Depósito Legal: M. 8.752 - 1975 .

External links 
 Rosa Galcerán Vilanova, Lambiek Comiclopedia  

1917 births
2015 deaths
20th-century Spanish women artists
Spanish female comics artists
Spanish comics artists
Spanish illustrators
Spanish women illustrators
Spanish women poets
Spanish poets
People from Barcelona

Mis Chicas